Clarence Russell McNutt (November 9, 1907 – February 2, 1972) was an American canoeist who competed in the 1936 Summer Olympics.

He was born in Philadelphia.

In 1936 he finished fifth together with his partner Robert Graf in the C-2 1000 metre event.

References
Clarence McNutt's profile at Sports Reference.com

1907 births
1972 deaths
Sportspeople from Philadelphia
American male canoeists
Canoeists at the 1936 Summer Olympics
Olympic canoeists of the United States